Arslanbek Açilow (born 1 July 1993) is a middleweight amateur boxer from Turkmenistan. He competed in the 2016 Olympics, but was eliminated in the first bout. His elder brother Aziz is also an international boxer.

References

External links

 

1993 births
Living people
Turkmenistan male boxers
Olympic boxers of Turkmenistan
Boxers at the 2016 Summer Olympics
Place of birth missing (living people)
Boxers at the 2014 Asian Games
Asian Games competitors for Turkmenistan
Middleweight boxers